Mittal Steel Company N.V. was an Indian company and one of the world's largest steel producers by volume and turnover. After a merger in 2005, it is now part of ArcelorMittal.

History
Mittal Steel Company was formed as Ispat International in 1978. At the time it was part of the Indian Steel company Ispat Industries which had been founded by Lakshmi Mittal's father in 1984. It was owned by the Mittal family, but in 1995 Ispat International separated from Ispat Industires after various disagreements between Lakshmi and his father.

In 1989, the company acquired Iron & Steel Company of Trinidad & Tobago. In 1992, the company acquired Sibalsa. In 1994, the company acquired Sidbec-Dosco. In 1995, the company acquired Hamburger Stahlwerke, which formed Ispat International Ltd. and Ispat Shipping, and also bought Karmet Steel of Temirtau, Kazakhstan. Between 1996 and 1997, the company acquired Irish Steel Limited, Walzdraht Hochfeld GmbH and Stahlwerk Ruhrort. In 1997, the company went public as Ispat International NV.  In 1998, the company acquired Inland Steel Company. In 1999, the company acquired Unimétal. In 2001, the company acquired ALFASID and Sidex. In 2002, it bought a majority stake in Iscor. In 2003, the company acquired Nowa Huta.

In 2004, the company acquired Polskie Huty Stali, BH Steel, and certain Macedonian facilities from Balkan Steel. In 2005, the company hired Deloitte as the primary auditors for the company. In 2005, the company acquired International Steel Group. In 2005, the company acquired Kryvorizhstal. In 2005, the company announced the investment of $9 billion in Jharkhand, India. In 2006, the company merged with Arcelor after much controversy. In 2006, the company announced investment for a 12 million tonne capacity steel plant in Odisha, India.

Company 
CEO Lakshmi Mittal's family owned 88% of the company. Mittal Steel was based in Rotterdam but managed from London by Mittal and his son Aditya. It was formed when Ispat International N.V. acquired LNM Holdings N.V. (both were already controlled by Lakshmi Mittal) and merged with International Steel Group in 2004. On 25 June 2006, Mittal Steel decided to take over Arcelor, with the new company to be called ArcelorMittal. The takeover was successfully approved by shareholders and directors of Arcelor making L.N. Mittal the largest steel maker in the world.

Bids and acquisitions 
In October 2005 Mittal Steel acquired Ukrainian steel manufacturer Kryvorizhstal for $4.8 billion in an auction after a controversial earlier sale for a much lower price to a consortium including the son-in-law of ex-President Leonid Kuchma was cancelled by the incoming government of President Viktor Yushchenko.

In 2005 Lakshmi Mittal flew into Jharkhand, India to announce a $9 billion investment to build a greenfield steel plant with a 12 million tonnes per annum production capacity.

On 27 January 2006 it announced a $23.3 billion (€18.6 billion, £12.7 billion) bid for Arcelor. On 19 May 2006 Mittal increased its offer for Arcelor by 38.7% to $32.4bn, or $47.34 per share (€25.8bn, €37.74 per share). On 25 June 2006 Arcelor, in a board meeting announced that it has accepted a further sweetened offer ($50.68 or €40.4 per share) and the new company would now be called ArcelorMittal, thus successfully ending one of the most controversial and publicised takeover bids in modern corporate history. ArcelorMittal is now by far the largest steelmaker in the world by turnover as well as volume, controlling 10% of the total world steel output.

See also 
ArcelorMittal
Arcelor
Tadeusz Sendzimir Steelworks

References

.
Manufacturing companies based in Rotterdam
Defunct companies of the Netherlands
Steel companies of the Netherlands
Manufacturing companies established in 1989
Manufacturing companies disestablished in 2006
2006 disestablishments in the Netherlands
Multinational companies headquartered in the Netherlands
Dutch companies disestablished in 2006
Dutch companies established in 1989